Carol Farrington Jopling ( – ) was an anthropologist, Librarian, and chief librarian of the Smithsonian Tropical Research Institute between 1981 and 1984.

Personal life 
She had one brother, Robert K. Farrington.

She married aeronautical engineer Peter White Jopling in 1940. They had three children: Morgan W. Jopling, John P. Jopling, and Hannah Jopling. Carol and Peter Jopling would later divorce.

Education 
Jopling graduated from Vassar College in 1938 with a bachelor's degree in Art history. She earned both of her master's degrees from Catholic University of America one in library science in 1960 and the second in anthropology in 1963. In 1973, she received her doctorate from the University of Massachusetts in anthropology. Her dissertation is titled "Women Weavers of Yalalag; Their Art and Its Process."

Career 

From 1960-1961, Jopling worked as a librarian at the University of Maryland. Jopling worked for several federal entities throughout the 1960s. She worked for the Library Congress (1961), Smithsonian Institution Bureau of American Ethnology(1961-1962), the United States Information Agency (1962-1963), and the Central Intelligence Agency (1963-1967). She was a social science bibliographer at University of Massachusetts Amherst. She also taught art and anthropology from 1967 to 1975 at American University, Catholic University of America, North Adams State College, Harvard University, University of Massachusetts Amherst, and Tufts University. From 1975 to 1979, Jopling was a research associate at Peabody Museum of Archaeology and Ethnology.

In 1981, Jopling became the chief librarian of the Smithsonian's Tropical Research Institute located in Panama.

She retired in 1984.

Awards and honors 
Carol F. Jopling's book Puerto Rican Houses in Sociohistorical Perspective (1988) won the 1989 Allen Noble Book award for best edited book from the International Society for Landscape, Place, & Material Culture.

Death and legacy 
Carol F. Jopling died on 13 October 2000 in Bethesda.

References

External links
  Jopling's Dissertation - “Women Weavers of Yalalag; Their Art and Its Process."
  Jopling's 1971 book - Art and Aesthetics in Primitive Societies; A Critical Anthology
  Jopling's 1989 book - The Coppers of the Northwest Coast indians : Their Origins, Development, and Possible Antecedents
  Jopling transcribed the text in the 2003 book - Journal of a Voyage Around the World : A Year on the Ship Helena (1842-1842)

Created via preloaddraft
American librarians
Vassar College alumni
Catholic University of America alumni
University of Massachusetts alumni
Smithsonian Institution people
Women anthropologists
2000 deaths
1916 births
American women librarians
People from Louiseville